Kerstin Stegemann (born 29 September 1977) is a German former footballer who played as a defender or midfielder.

Career
Born in Rheine-Mesum, she made her football debut at age 15 in 1993, playing for FFC Heike Rheine in the Frauen-Bundesliga. Within two years, she made her first appearance for the Germany national team, playing in a 13 April 1995 match against Poland. She went on to become a mainstay of the national team, playing on Germany's bronze medal-winning squads in the 2000 and 2004 Summer Olympics, as well as their 2003 Women's World Cup championship team.

Along with Birgit Prinz and Bettina Wiegmann, she is one of only three German women with more than 150 caps, having reached that mark in a 23 November 2006 match against Japan. She also holds a team record with 61 consecutive international matches played.

Stegemann retired in 2009 with 191 international appearances and eight goals to her credit.

International goals

Style of play
A right-back, Stegemann has been cited as one of the first overlapping full-backs in women’s football.

Honours
Germany
 FIFA Women's World Cup: 2003, 2007
 Football at the Summer Olympics: bronze medal 2000, 2004, 2008
 UEFA Women's Championship: 1997, 2001, 2005, 2009

Individual
 FIFA Women's World Cup All Star Team: 2007

References

External links 
 

1977 births
Living people
People from Rheine
Sportspeople from Münster (region)
German women's footballers
Footballers from North Rhine-Westphalia
Women's association football defenders
Women's association football midfielders
Germany women's international footballers
FIFA Century Club
FIFA Women's World Cup-winning players
UEFA Women's Championship-winning players
Olympic footballers of Germany
Olympic bronze medalists for Germany
Olympic medalists in football
Medalists at the 2000 Summer Olympics
Medalists at the 2004 Summer Olympics
Medalists at the 2008 Summer Olympics
1999 FIFA Women's World Cup players
2003 FIFA Women's World Cup players
2007 FIFA Women's World Cup players
Footballers at the 1996 Summer Olympics
Footballers at the 2000 Summer Olympics
Footballers at the 2004 Summer Olympics
Footballers at the 2008 Summer Olympics
FCR 2001 Duisburg players
FFC Heike Rheine players
SG Wattenscheid 09 (women) players